The 2017 Oceania Rugby Cup for national rugby union teams in the Oceania region was held in Cook Islands at the National Stadium in Rarotonga on 4 August 2017. With Papua New Guinea being forced to withdraw, only two countries remained in the competition played as a straight knock-out match as part of Oceania qualification for the 2019 Rugby World Cup.

Tahiti, as the winner of the match over host nation Cook Islands, advanced to the Asia/Oceania play-off repechage, to play the winner of Round 3 of the Asian qualification process.

Because Tahiti was disqualified from moving on for fielding ineligible players, Cook Islands moved on and will now face Hong Kong.

Match

References

2017
2017 rugby union tournaments for national teams
2017 in Oceanian rugby union
2017 in Cook Islands sport